Nanohaloarchaea is a clade of diminutive archaea with small genomes and limited metabolic capabilities, belonging to the DPANN archaea. They are ubiquitous in hypersaline habitats, which they share with the extremely halophilic haloarchaea.

Nanohaloarchaea were first identified from metagenomic data as a class of uncultivated halophilic archaea composed of 6 clades and were subsequently placed in the phylum Nanohaloarchaeota within the Diapherotrites, Parvarchaeota, Aenigmarchaeota, Nanoarchaeota, Nanohaloarchaeota (DPANN) superphylum. However the phylogenetic position of nanohaloarchaea is still highly debated, being alternatively proposed as the sister-lineage of haloarchaea or a member of the DPANN super-phylum.

The lineage has since been identified in data from a range of hypersaline environments including: Australian thalassohaline lake, Spanish saltern, Russian soda brine, Californian saltern, and Chilean halite

Taxonomy
The currently accepted taxonomy is based on the List of Prokaryotic names with Standing in Nomenclature (LPSN) and National Center for Biotechnology Information (NCBI).

Phylum "Nanohaloarchaeota" corrig. Rinke et al. 2013
 Class "Nanohaloarchaeia" corrig. Narasingarao et al. 2012
 Order "Nanohaloarchaeales" 
 Family "Nanohaloarchaeaceae" 
 Genus ?"Candidatus Nanohaloarchaeum" corrig. Hamm et al. 2019
 "Ca. N. antarcticum" corrig. Hamm et al. 2019
 Class "Nanohalobiia" corrig. La Cono et al. 2020
 Order "Nanohalobiales" La Cono et al. 2020 ["Nanosalinales" Rinke et al. 2020]
 Family "Nanohalobiaceae" La Cono et al. 2020 ["Nanosalinaceae" Rinke et al. 2020]
 Genus ?"Candidatus Haloredivivus" Ghai et al. 2011
 Genus ?"Candidatus Nanopetraeus" corrig. Crits‐Christoph et al. 2016 ["Nanopetramus" (sic)]
 Genus "Candidatus Nanohalobium" La Cono et al. 2020
 "Ca. N. constans" La Cono et al. 2020
 Genus "Candidatus Nanosalina" Narasingarao et al. 2012
 Genus "Candidatus Nanosalinicola" corrig. Narasingarao et al. 2012 ["Nanosalinarum" (sic)]

References

Further reading
 
 

Archaea classes
Euryarchaeota